Women in Love (1920) is a novel by English author D. H. Lawrence. It is a sequel to his earlier novel The Rainbow (1915) and follows the continuing loves and lives of the Brangwen sisters, Gudrun and Ursula. Gudrun Brangwen, an artist, pursues a destructive relationship with Gerald Crich, an industrialist. Lawrence contrasts this pair with the love that develops between Ursula Brangwen and Rupert Birkin, an alienated intellectual who articulates many opinions associated with the author. The emotional relationships thus established are given further depth and tension by an intense psychological and physical attraction between Gerald and Rupert.

The novel ranges over the whole of British society before the time of the First World War and eventually concludes in the snows of the Tyrolean Alps. Ursula's character draws on Lawrence's wife Frieda and Gudrun's on Katherine Mansfield, while Rupert Birkin's has elements of Lawrence himself, and Gerald Crich is partly based on Mansfield's husband, John Middleton Murry.

Plot summary 
Ursula and Gudrun Brangwen are sisters living in The Midlands in England in the 1910s. Ursula is a schoolteacher, Gudrun a painter. They meet two men who live nearby, school inspector Rupert Birkin and Gerald Crich, heir to a coal mine, and the four become friends. Romantic relationships quickly develop as the novel progresses.

All four are deeply concerned with questions of society, politics, and the relationship between men and women. At a party at Shortlands, the Birkin's country manor home, Gerald's sister Diana drowns. Gudrun becomes the teacher and mentor of Gerald's youngest sister. Soon, Gerald's coal-mine-owning father dies as well, after a long illness. After the funeral, Gerald goes to Gudrun's house and spends the night with her while her parents sleep in another room.

Birkin asks Ursula to marry him, and she agrees. Gerald and Gudrun's relationship, however, becomes stormy.

The two couples take a holiday together in the Austrian Alps. Gudrun begins an intense friendship with Loerke, a physically puny but emotionally commanding artist from Dresden. Gerald, enraged by Loerke and most of all by Gudrun's verbal abuse and rejection of his manhood, and driven by his own internal violence, tries to strangle Gudrun. He suddenly becomes disgusted with his actions and lets her go, and he leaves Gudrun and Loerke to climb the mountain eventually slipping into a snowy valley where he falls asleep and freezes to death.

The impact of Gerald's death upon Birkin is profound. The novel ends a few weeks after Gerald's death with Birkin trying to explain to Ursula that, although he needed no other woman than Ursula, he valued a relationship with Gerald that is gone forever.

Publication history 
After years of misunderstandings, accusations of duplicity, and hurried letters, Thomas Seltzer finally published the first edition of Women in Love in New York City, on 9 November 1920. This had come after three drawn out years of delays and revisions. This first limited edition (1,250 books) was available only to subscribers, due to the controversy caused by Lawrence's previous work, The Rainbow (1915).

Originally, the two books were written as parts of a single novel, but the publisher had decided to publish them separately and in rapid succession. The first book's treatment of sexuality was frank for the mores of the time, and, after an obscenity trial, the book was banned in the UK for 11 years, although it was available in the US. The publisher then backed out of publishing the second book in the UK, so Women in Love first appeared in the US. Martin Secker published the first trade edition of Women in Love in London,  on 10 June 1921.

Reception 
As with most of Lawrence's works, Women in Loves sexual subject matter caused controversy. For example, W. Charles Pilley, an early reviewer wrote of it in John Bull, "I do not claim to be a literary critic, but I know dirt when I smell it, and here is dirt in heaps—festering, putrid heaps which smell to high Heaven." Lawrence was sued for libel by Lady Ottoline Morrell and others, who claimed their likenesses were unjustly drawn upon in The Rainbow. The book also later stirred criticism for its portrayal of love, denounced as chauvinistic and centred upon the phallus by the philosopher Simone de Beauvoir in The Second Sex (1949).

In contrast, the critic Camille Paglia has praised Women in Love, writing in Vamps and Tramps (1994) that while she initially reacted negatively to the book, it became a "profound influence" on her as she was working on Sexual Personae (1990). Paglia compared Lawrence's novel to the poet Edmund Spenser's The Faerie Queene (1590). Paglia observed that while Women in Love has "bisexual implications", she is skeptical that Lawrence would have endorsed "full sexual relations" between men. The critic Harold Bloom listed Women in Love in his The Western Canon (1994) as one of the books that have been important and influential in Western culture. Francis Spalding suggested that Lawrence's fascination with the theme of homosexuality is manifested in Women in Love, and that this could be related to his own sexual orientation.  In 1999, the Modern Library ranked Women in Love forty-ninth on a list of the 100 best novels in English of the 20th century.

Adaptations

Film adaptation 
Screenwriter and producer Larry Kramer and director Ken Russell adapted the novel into the film, Women in Love (1969), for which Glenda Jackson won the Academy Award for Best Actress. It was one of the first American theatrical films to show male genitals, in scenes when Gerald Crich (Oliver Reed) and Rupert Birkin (Alan Bates) wrestle in the nude in front of a roaring fireplace, in several early skinny dipping shots, and in an explicit sequence of Birkin running naked in the forest after being hit on the head by his spurned former mistress, Hermione Roddice (Eleanor Bron).

Radio and television adaptations 
William Ivory combined Women in Love with Lawrence's earlier novel, The Rainbow (1915), in his two-part BBC Four television adaptation titled, Women in Love (first transmitted 24 and 31 March 2011), directed by Miranda Bowen. The cast is headed by Saskia Reeves as the mother, Anna Brangwen, with Rachael Stirling and Rosamund Pike as her daughters, Ursula and Gudrun. Other cast members include Rory Kinnear as Rupert Birkin, Joseph Mawle as Gerald Crich, and Ben Daniels as Will Brangwen. In this adaptation, Ivory sets the final scenes and Gerald's death not in the Tyrolean Alps, but in South African diamond mines and desert sands, where Gerald walks out in the dunes and meets his demise.

BBC Radio 4 broadcast Women in Love as a four-part serial in 1996, dramatised by Elaine Feinstein and starring Stella Gonet as Gudrun, Clare Holman as Ursula, Douglas Hodge as Gerald and Nicholas Farrell as Rupert. It has been repeated several times on BBC Radio 4 Extra, most recently in July 2022.

Editions 
 
 
 
 
 
 
  (This edition displays significant differences from the final published version.)
  (This discarded section of an early version of the novel is set four years after Gerald and Birkin have returned from a skiing holiday, and was published as an appendix to The Cambridge Edition.)

Literary criticism

References

External links 

 
 Plot Summary and Analysis at Modernism Lab Essays

Novels by D. H. Lawrence
1920 British novels
British novels adapted into films
English novels
British novels adapted into television shows
Modernist novels
Obscenity controversies in literature
Sequel novels